The Tupolev Tu-16 (NATO reporting name: Badger) is a twin-engined jet strategic heavy bomber used by the Soviet Union. It has been flown for almost 70 years, and the Chinese license-built Xian H-6 remains in service with the People's Liberation Army Air Force.

Development

In the late 1940s, the Soviet Union was strongly committed to matching the United States in strategic bombing capability. The Soviets' only long-range bomber at the time was Tupolev's Tu-4 'Bull', a reverse-engineered copy of the American B-29 Superfortress. The development of the notably powerful Mikulin AM-3 turbojet led to the possibility of a large, jet-powered bomber.

The Tupolev design bureau began work on the Tu-88 ("Aircraft N") prototypes in 1950. The Tu-88 first flew on 27 April 1952. After winning a competition against the Ilyushin Il-46, it was approved for production in December 1952. The first production bombers entered service with Frontal Aviation in 1954, receiving the service designation Tu-16. It received the NATO reporting name Badger-A.

It had a new, large swept wing and two large Mikulin AM-3 turbojets, one in each wing root. Production took place in three aviation plants, Kazan Aircraft Production Association, Kuybyshev, and Voronezh Aircraft Production Association.

Although the Tu-16 began as a high-altitude, free-fall bomber, in the mid-1950s, it was equipped to carry early Soviet cruise missiles. They were intended for use primarily against US Navy aircraft carriers and other large surface ships. Subsequent Tu-16s were converted to carry later, more advanced missiles, while their designations changed several times.

A versatile design, the Tu-16 was built in numerous specialized variants for aerial reconnaissance, maritime surveillance, electronic intelligence gathering (ELINT), and electronic warfare (ECM). In total, 1,507 aircraft were constructed in three plants in the Soviet Union, in 1954–1962. A civilian adaptation, the Tupolev Tu-104, saw passenger service with Aeroflot. The Tu-16 was also exported to Indonesia, Egypt, and Iraq. It continued to be used by the Air Forces and naval aviation of the Soviet Union and subsequently Russia, until 1993.

Delivery of the Tu-16 to China began in 1958, and the Xi'an Aircraft Industrial Corporation  license-produced the aircraft under the Chinese designation Xian H-6. At least 120 of these aircraft remain in service. On 14 May 1965, one of the PLAAF Tu-16 bombers carried out the first airborne nuclear weapon test inside China.

Variants

Among the main production variants of the Badger were the Tu-16 and Tu-16A bombers and Tu-16KS and Tu-16K-10 missile carriers, Tu-16SPS, "Elka", and Tu-16Ye ECM aircraft, Tu-16R reconnaissance aircraft, and Tu-16T torpedo bombers; others were produced from conversions. Individual aircraft could be modified several times, with designations changed, especially concerning missile-carrying aircraft.

 "Aircraft 88" - Initial prototype.
 "Aircraft 97" - Twin-engined long-range bomber development project of Tu-16 with two RD-5 engines.
 "Aircraft 103" - Supersonic bomber development project of Tu-16 with four VD-7 AM-13 engines.
 Badger A (Tu-16) – This is the basic configuration of the Tu-16 bomber deployed in 1954 to replace the Tu-4. Several modified models of this variant existed, all of which were known as Badger A in the West.

 Tu-16A – Modified Tu-16s designed to carry nuclear bombs, one of main versions, with 453 built. Many of these were subsequently converted into other variants.
 Tu-16Z – An early specialized version of the Tu-16 that served as airborne tankers (a refuelling method: wing-to-wing), though retaining their medium bomber role.
 Tu-16G (Tu-104G) – Fast air mail model, Aeroflot aircrew training version.
 Tu-16N – A dedicated tanker version for Tu-22/Tu-22M bombers, with probe and drogue system. Entered service in 1963. Similar aircraft Tu-16NN converted from Tu-16Z.
 Tu-16T – Limited production maritime strike version (torpedo bomber), that served in the Soviet Naval Aviation, and carried torpedoes, mines and depth charges. 76 built and some more converted. All units subsequently converted into Tu-16S configuration.
 Tu-16S – A lifeboat carrier version used for search and rescue operations.
 Tu-16Ye – These were equipped with heavy electronic warfare and electronic intelligence (ELINT) equipment.
 Badger B (Tu-16KS) – Variant designed as a launch platform for two AS-1 Kennel/KS-1 Komet missiles. 107 built in 1954–1958, served with the Soviet Naval Aviation, Egypt and Indonesia. Soviet ones later converted with newer missiles.

 Badger C (Tu-16K-10) – Another Naval Aviation variant, units of this version carried a single AS-2 Kipper/K-10S anti-ship missile. 216 built in 1958–1963. It differed from other variants in having a radar in a nose. A further development, the Tu-16K-10-26, carried a single K-10S and two KSR-2 or KSR-5 AS-6 Kingfish missiles (K-26 missile complex). Some were later converted into ELINT platforms.
 Badger D (Tu-16RM-1) – Maritime reconnaissance model with ELINT equipment; 23 converted from Tu-16K-10. It retained its radar in a nose and could guide K-10S missiles, fired from other planes, at targets.
 Badger E (Tu-16R) – Reconnaissance version of the airframe, with ELINT equipment, first of all meant for maritime reconnaissance. It could guide KS missiles.
 Tu-16RM-2 – modified Tu-16R, serving in the Naval Aviation. It could guide KSR-2 missiles.
 Tu-16KRM – Launch platforms for  target drones (a variant of Tu-16K-26).
 Badger F (Tu-16RM-2) – Another reconnaissance version based on the −16R/RM but with the addition of external ELINT equipment.

 Badger G (Tu-16K/Tu-16KSR) – Serving in the Naval Aviation, these were conversions from earlier models. These were designed to carry bombs in internal bays in addition to carrying air-to-surface missiles externally, such as the AS-5 Kelt and AS-6 Kingfish. There existed numerous variants, designated either from carried missile complex (K-11, K-16 and K-26) or from missiles of these complexes (KSR-11, KSR-2 and KSR-5). Following further modifications, they were also given suffixes. Main variants:
Tu-16KSR-2 – carrying the K-16 complex (two KSR-2 missiles). Used from 1962. Similar aircraft, converted from other variants, were designated Tu-16K-16.
Tu-16K-11-16 – carrying the K-16 complex (KSR-2 missiles) or the K-11 complex (two anti-radar KSR-11 missiles). Used from 1962. Similar aircraft were designated Tu-16KSR-2-11. Over 440 Tu-16 could carry the K-16 or K-11 complex.

Tu-16K-26 – carrying the K-26 complex (two KSR-5 missiles), retaining a capability of KSR-2 and 11 missiles. Used from 1969. Similar aircraft were designated Tu-16KSR-2-5-11 or Tu-16KSR-2-5 (no KSR-11 capability). Over 240 Tu-16 could carry the K-26 complex.
Tu-16K-26P – carrying the K-26P missiles (two anti-radar KSR-5P missiles, as well as KSR-5, 2 or 11).
 Badger H (Tu-16 Elka) – Designed for stand-off electronic warfare and electronic counter-measures support.
 Badger J (Tu-16P Buket) – Another electronic warfare variant configured as an ECM strike escort.
 Badger K (Tu-16Ye) – Believed to be a version of the Badger F configuration possessing enhanced ELINT capability.
 Badger L (Tu-16P) – Another version of the Badger J with more modern systems and used in ELINT role.
 "Aircraft 90" - Turboprop-powered project.
 Tu-104 - Civilian airliner version.

Former operators

 
Armenian Air Force: 30 aircraft inherited from the Soviet Union. Out of service by 1995.
 
Azerbaijan Air Force: 10 aircraft inherited from the Soviet Union. Out of service by 1995.
 
Belarus Air Force: 18 aircraft inherited upon the fall of the Soviet Union, out of service by 1995.
 
People's Liberation Army Air Force: A few Tu-16s were acquired in 1959; the type was then built under licence as the Xian H-6.
 
Egyptian Air Force: Operated Tu-16KS, Tu-16T, Tu-16KSR-2-11, and Tu-16R. Also operated H-6. Last retired in 2000. By 1966, Air Group 65, with its primary base at Cairo West Air Base, was operating three squadrons of Tu-16s: No. 34 and 36 Squadrons with bomber variants, and No. 95 Squadron equipped with the Tu-16KS' that could carry AS-1 Kennel air-to-surface missiles.
 
Georgian Air Force: 20 aircraft inherited from the Soviet Union. Out of service by 1995.
 

Indonesian Air Force (TNI-AU): 26 Tu-16KS-1 acquired in 1961. Used during the preparation of Operation Trikora in 1962, being the capture of Western New Guinea from the Netherlands (now Papua and Papua Barat). All were based at Iswahjudi Air Force Base, Madiun, East Java, and were grounded in 1969. Removed from service in 1970.
 
Iraqi Air Force: 8 x Tu-16 and 6 x Tu-16KSR-2-11. Also operated 4 B-6D (H-6D). One B-6D was downed during the Iran-Iraq War. Two were destroyed in Operation Desert Storm in 1991.
 
Russian Air Force
Russian Naval Aviation
 
Soviet Air Force (transferred to successor states)
Soviet Naval Aviation (transferred to successor states)
 
Ukrainian Air Force: 121 aircraft inherited from USSR. All retired from service.

Notable accidents
 On 25 May 1968 a Soviet Air Force Tu-16 Badger-F piloted by Colonel Andrey Pliyev buzzed the US Navy aircraft carrier  in the Norwegian Sea. The Tu-16 made four passes, and on the last a wing clipped the sea and it crashed with no survivors. Parts of three bodies were recovered by the US.
On 1 February 1971 a modified Tu-16 flying laboratory crashed during testing of a new jet engine, resulting in the death of the entire crew, including test pilot Amet-khan Sultan.
 On 28 August 1978 an early model Tu-16 crashed on Hopen island in Svalbard, Norway. All seven crew were killed in the accident. It was discovered by a four-man Norwegian weather forecasting team. The Soviets refused to admit the loss of an aircraft until the bodies of the crew were given to them. Norway transcribed the contents of the flight recorder over the objections of the Soviet government.
 On 27 June 1980 a Soviet Air Force Tu-16 Badger on a Tokyo Express flight crashed near Komatsu Air Base in Ishikawa Prefecture in the Sea of Japan. There were no survivors. The remains of three crew members were recovered by the Japanese Maritime Self-Defense Force ship Nemuro.

Specifications (Tu-16)

See also

References

Footnotes

Bibliography

 Russian Strategic Nuclear Forces,edited by Pavel Podvig, The MIT Press, 2001.
 Soviet Military Power: 1983, 1984, 1986, 1987, 1988
 Ту-16. Ракетно-бомбовый ударный комплекс Советских ВВС, Voyna v Vozduhye series no 26
 EDISI KOLEKSI ANGKASA, RUDAL UDARA TRACKED AND DESTROYED, Edition of September 2006.

External links

 Global Security.org
 FAS on the Tu-16
 Xian H-6 Badger
 H-6 Medium Bomber
 http://airwar.ru/ – Ugolok Neba (Russian language)
 H-6H and H-6K Cruise Missile Bomber, AirForceWorld.com

1950s Soviet bomber aircraft
Tu-0016
Twinjets
Mid-wing aircraft
Aircraft first flown in 1952
Soviet and Russian military tanker aircraft
Electronic warfare aircraft